08/15 may refer to:

 MG 08/15, machine gun
 08/15 (film series)
 08/15 (film), first part of the film series